The Africa section of 2015 Rugby World Cup qualifying saw thirteen teams competing for one direct qualification spot into the final tournament in England, and one spot in the Repechage play-offs.

Format
The Africa Cup, run by the Confederation of African Rugby (CAR), was the regional qualification tournament for Rugby World Cup 2015, with Divisions 1A, 1B and 1C involved in the process. The 2012 Divisions 1B and 1C acted as the qualification matches in Round 1, with the Division 1C winner being promoted to Division 1B for the second round in 2013, while the bottom placed team in Division 1B was relegated to 1C and eliminated from Rugby World Cup contention. 2013 saw Divisions 1A and 1B act as the qualification matches in Round 2. The top three teams of Division 1A remained in that same division for the final round in 2014, to be joined by the winner of Division 1B in 2013. The teams that did not win Division 1B or were relegated out of 1A were eliminated from Rugby World Cup qualification. Namibia, the winner of Round 3, or Division 1A, in 2014 qualified for the 2015 Rugby World Cup as Africa 1, while the runner-up, Zimbabwe, entered the Repechage for a second chance to qualify.

Entrants
Thirteen teams competed for the 2015 Rugby World Cup – Africa qualification. Shown in parentheses are the teams' world rankings prior to the first African qualification match on 4 July 2012.

  (81)
  (47)
  (40)
  (56)
  (NR)
  (27)
  (91)
  (21)
  (52)
  (34)
  (43)
  (74)
  (32)

Qualified nations
  (Automatic qualifier)
  (Africa 1)

Round 1

The first round consisted of nine matches between nine teams. The winner of the Africa Cup Division 1C (Round 1B), advanced to the second round and was promoted to Division 1B for 2013, while the top three teams in CAR Division 1B (Round 1A), also advanced into the second round.

Round 1A: 2012 Africa Cup Division 1B
The 2012 Africa Cup Division 1B took place in Madagascar at Mahamasina Stadium in Antananarivo on 4 July and 8 July. The champion, Madagascar, was promoted up to Division 1A thus advancing to Round 2B. Namibia and Senegal remained in Division 1B for 2013, advancing to Round 2A. Morocco was eliminated from Rugby World Cup, by virtue of being relegated to Division 1C for 2013.

Round 1B: 2012 Africa Cup Division 1C
The 2012 Africa Cup Division 1C took place in Botswana at UB Stadium in Gaborone from 22 July to 28 July. The champions, Botswana, were promoted up to Division 1B for 2013, thus advancing to Round 2A. Ivory Coast, Mauritius, Zambia and Nigeria were eliminated from Rugby World Cup qualifying.

Round 2

The second round consisted of eight matches featuring the top eight teams in Africa outside of South Africa. The top three teams of CAR Division 1A advanced to the third round, while the winner of CAR Division 1B was promoted to Division 1A thus advancing to the third round.

Round 2A: 2013 Africa Cup Division 1B
The 2013 Africa Cup Division 1B took place in Senegal at Stade Iba Mar Diop in Dakar on 11 June and 15 June. The champions, Namibia, were promoted to Division 1A to Round 3, while Botswana, Senegal and Tunisia were eliminated from Rugby World Cup qualifying.

Round 2B: 2013 Africa Cup Division 1A
The 2013 Africa Cup Division 1A took place in Madagascar at Mahamasina Stadium in Antananarivo on 10 July and 14 July. The top three teams, Kenya, Zimbabwe and Madagascar, remained in Division 1A for 2014, thus advancing to Round 3, while Uganda were eliminated from Rugby World Cup Qualifying.

Round 3: 2014 Africa Cup Division 1A

The third and final round consisted of 6 matches, featuring the top 4 ranked teams in Africa in a Round-robin format, and doubled as the 2014 Africa Cup Division 1A. The winner, Namibia, qualified for Pool C of the 2015 Rugby World Cup as Africa 1. The runner up, Zimbabwe, advanced to the repechage playoff against Russia.

The 2014 Africa Cup Division 1A took place in Madagascar at Mahamasina Stadium in Antananarivo, between 28 June and 6 July.

References

External links
 Rugby World Cup Africa qualification

2015
Africa
2012 in African rugby union
2013 in African rugby union
2014 in African rugby union